Cornelis Huig Jan "Jan-Cor" van der Greef (born 6 April 1983 in Vianen) is a Dutch sport shooter. He has competed for the Netherlands at the 2004 Summer Olympics, and also established a junior world record for a fifth-place finish at the 2003 European Championships in Brno, Czech Republic. Van der Greef is a member of Snip Shooting Club and a resident athlete of the Royal Netherlands Shooting Federation, where he trains under head coach Nelia Heemskerk.

Van der Greef qualified for the Dutch shooting team, as a 21-year-old, in the men's skeet at the 2004 Summer Olympics in Athens. He had registered a minimum qualifying score of 123 to join with his fellow shooter and then incoming five-time Olympian Hennie Dompeling, and fill in the second Olympic quota for the Netherlands from his fiery fifth-place finish at the European Championships a year earlier. A newcomer to the international competition, Van der Greef shot 115 targets out of a possible 125 in the qualifying round to force a three-way tie with Great Britain's Richard Brickell and Egypt's Amr El-Gaiar for thirty-fourth place from an immense field of forty-one shooters.

References

External links
 

1983 births
Living people
Dutch male sport shooters
Olympic shooters of the Netherlands
Shooters at the 2004 Summer Olympics
People from Vianen
Sportspeople from Utrecht (province)
21st-century Dutch people